Ravindran Kannan (born 12 March 1953, Madras) is a Principal Researcher at Microsoft Research India, where he leads the algorithms research group. He is also the first adjunct faculty of Computer Science and Automation Department of Indian Institute of Science.

Before joining Microsoft, he was the William K. Lanman Jr. Professor of Computer Science and Professor of Applied Mathematics at Yale University.  He has also taught at MIT, CMU and IISc. The ACM Special Interest Group on Algorithms and Computation Theory (SIGACT) presented its 2011 Knuth Prize to Ravi Kannan for developing influential algorithmic techniques aimed at solving long-standing computational problems. He also served on the Mathematical Sciences jury for the Infosys Prize in 2012 and 2013.

Ravi Kannan did his B.Tech at IIT, Bombay. He received his PhD in 1980 at Cornell University under Leslie Earl Trotter, Jr. His research interests include Algorithms, Theoretical Computer Science and Discrete Mathematics as well as Optimization. His work has mainly focused on efficient algorithms for problems of a mathematical (often geometric) flavor that arise in Computer Science. He has worked on algorithms for integer programming and the geometry of numbers, random walks in n-space, randomized algorithms for linear algebra and learning algorithms for convex sets.

Key contributions
Among his many contributions, two are
 Polynomial-time algorithm for approximating the volume of convex bodies
 Algorithmic version for Szemerédi regularity partition

Selected works

Books 
 2013. Foundations of Data Science. (with John Hopcroft).

Other representative publications
 "Clustering in large graphs and matrices," with P. Drineas, A. Frieze, S. Vempala and V. Vinay, Proceedings of the Symposium on Discrete Algorithms, 1999.
 "A Polynomial-Time Algorithm for learning noisy Linear Threshold functions," with A. Blum, A. Frieze and S. Vempala, Algorithmica 22:35–52, 1998.
 "Covering Minima and lattice point free convex bodies," with L. Lovász, Annals of Mathematics, 128:577–602, 1988.

Awards and honors
 Joint Winner of the 1991 Fulkerson Prize in Discrete Mathematics for his work on the volumes of convex bodies.
Knuth Prize 2011 for developing influential algorithmic techniques aimed at solving long-standing computational problems.
In 2017 he became a Fellow of the Association for Computing Machinery.

See also 
 Szemerédi regularity lemma
 Alan M. Frieze
 Avrim Blum
 László Lovász

References

External links
  Ravi Kannan's home page
 
 Distinguished Alumni Awardees 1999, IIT Bombay
 Fulkerson Prize Award

Indian computer scientists
20th-century Indian mathematicians
Yale University faculty
Tamil scientists
IIT Bombay alumni
Cornell University alumni
Living people
1953 births
Academic staff of the Indian Institute of Science
21st-century Indian mathematicians
Fellows of the Association for Computing Machinery
Knuth Prize laureates
Theoretical computer scientists